Dalison is a surname. Notable people with the surname include:

The Dalison baronets
Sir William Dalison (died 1559), English judge

See also
 Dallison (disambiguation)